Q3 Academy Great Barr (formerly Dartmouth High School) is a coeducational secondary school located on Wilderness Lane in Great Barr, West Midlands, England, near the border with Birmingham. It comes within the borders of Metropolitan Borough of Sandwell.

History
Dartmouth High School opened in September 1964 as a secondary modern school, becoming comprehensive in September 1969. The original motto, suggested by the Classics Teacher (later a drama teacher) Mr Bruce Graham was, "Gaudet, Tentamine et Virtus" (Strength rejoices in challenge).

The School originally had 8 houses, four in the A half and four in the B half. The A half houses were Churchill, Elgar, Sutherland and Nuffield. The B half houses were Hillary, Curie, Kennedy and Fleming. In the 1980s Nuffield and Hillary stopped taking pupils, leaving three active Houses in each half of the school.

It became Q3 Academy in September 2008, although it initially existed in the old Dartmouth buildings. In August 2008, the project to rebuild the school began. It took 21 months to build, and was ready for students in April 2010, straight after the Easter Holiday. The old building was demolished and the final landscaping phase took place over the summer of 2010, ready for students to start in September of that year.

As an academy, it is independent, with limited power remaining with the local authority.

On 11 November 2010, HRH the Earl of Wessex officially opened the Academy.

As Q3 Academy Langley and Q3 Academy Tipton have since been established by the Multi-Academy Trust, the original Q3 Academy has been renamed Q3 Academy Great Barr.

School Fires
In 1985 the western edge of the School, including the main Churchill block and Sutherland (including the school kitchens) were seriously damaged in a fire believed to be caused by arson. First year (now called year 7) pupils were allocated form rooms in temporary buildings on the tennis courts and the Maths and English departments used Temporary huts well into the 1990s whilst large sections of the School was rebuilt.

In the five years before the creation of the academy, the original school was damaged by fire on two further occasions. The school's science block was destroyed by fire on 17 November 2003 and had to be completely rebuilt. It needed about 100 firefighters to bring the blaze under control. Around 200 pupils lost their coursework in the blaze. There was also a blaze in June 2006 in the first year block. The cause of the fire was ruled as arson.

Notable former pupils
 John Bainbridge, author and countryside campaigner
 John Constandinou, athlete
 Cat Deeley, television personality
 Matt Goodwin, managing director of architecture initiative
 James Holmes, actor
 Matthew Marsden, actor
 Arun Singh, Professional Trader and coach
 Dean Smith, footballer
 Gillian Wearing, artist
 Steve Webb, Liberal Democrat MP
 Rob Young, author
Tim Jones, Olympian

References

External links
 School performance in 2007
 EduBase
 Ofsted report for Q3 Academy
 Great Barr £30 million Q3 Academy opens its doors to students

News items
 Arson attack in June 2006
 Lessons resume after blaze in November 2003

Academies in Sandwell
West Bromwich
Secondary schools in Sandwell
School buildings in the United Kingdom destroyed by arson
Great Barr
Educational institutions established in 1964
1964 establishments in England